Lutfest is an international puppetry festival held annually in East Sarajevo, Republika Srpska, and Bosnia and Herzegovina. It was established in 1999 and has subsequently become the premier festival of its kind in the Former Yugoslavia. The festival has hosted some of the world's most well known puppeteers, including Paul McGinnis, Bruce Lanoil, and Peter Schumann.

References

Recurring events established in 1999
May events
Tourist attractions in Sarajevo
Annual events in Bosnia and Herzegovina
Theatre festivals in Bosnia and Herzegovina
Festivals in Sarajevo